Silvio Angelo "Sam" Bettio (December 1, 1928 – June 14, 2006) was a Canadian professional ice hockey player who played in the National Hockey League (NHL). He spent one season in the NHL, playing 44 games for the Boston Bruins during the 1949–50 season. The rest of his career, which lasted from 1947 to 1962, was mainly spent in the minor American Hockey League.

Career statistics

Regular season and playoffs

References

External links

1928 births
2006 deaths
Boston Bruins players
Boston Olympics players
Buffalo Bisons (AHL) players
Canadian ice hockey left wingers
Hershey Bears players
Ice hockey people from Ontario
Ontario Hockey Association Senior A League (1890–1979) players
Sportspeople from Greater Sudbury
Sudbury Wolves (EPHL) players
Vancouver Canucks (WHL) players